Kisi is a Bantu language of Tanzania. Though only half or so of the Kisi people speak the language, use is vigorous where it is still spoken.

Phonology

Other phonemes:

 [ɾ] and [l] are in a free variation.
 [w] and [j] are not included in a phoneme chart in Kisi because they only occur as glide insertion between historically or morphologically adjacent vowels. [w] does not occur otherwise. For some speakers, [j] occurs as a free variant of [ʝ] which is considered incorrect by other speakers.

Contrastive and obligatory length is marked with /:/. This does not necessarily reflect a difference in the length of production.

Swahili: bei, and Swahili: ngao - These Swahili words have been borrowed into Kisi and pronounced with a diphthong in Kisi

References

 

Languages of Tanzania
Northeast Bantu languages